Serine/threonine-protein kinase SRPK2 is an enzyme that in humans is encoded by the SRPK2 gene.

Interactions 

SRPK2 has been shown to interact with:
 ASF/SF2 and
 U2AF2.

References

Further reading